Virginia Christine (born Virginia Christine Ricketts; March 5, 1920 – July 24, 1996) was an American stage, radio, film, television, and voice actress. Though Christine had a long career as a character actress in film and television, she is probably best remembered as "Mrs. Olson" (or the "Folgers Coffee Woman") in a string of television commercials for Folgers Coffee during the 1960s and 1970s.

Early life
Christine was born in Stanton in Montgomery County in southwestern Iowa. She was of Swedish descent. Upon her mother's remarriage, she changed her last name to "Kraft". The family later moved to Des Moines in Polk County, where Virginia attended Elmwood Elementary School. The family relocated again to Des Moines County in southeastern Iowa, not to be confused with the state capital in central Iowa. There Christine attended Mediapolis High School, where she aspired to be a concert pianist. Her family later moved to California, where she enrolled at UCLA.

Career

Radio and films

Christine began working in radio during college. Later, she appeared several times in the radio version of Gunsmoke, including the December 4, 1954 episode "Cholera", the February 19, 1955 episode "Poor Pearl", the September 3, 1955 episode "Change of Heart", the October 8, 1955 episode "Good Girl, Bad Company", the December 4, 1955 episode "Sunny Afternoon", the May 13, 1956 episode "Cows and Cribs", the September 9, 1956 episode "Belle's Back", the October 28, 1956 episode "Dirty Bill's Girl", the November 23, 1957 episode "Fingered", the October 5, 1958 episode "Tag You're It", the September 6, 1959 episode "Matt's Decision", the December 6, 1959 episode "Big Chugg Wilson", the January 24, 1960 episode "Bless Me 'Till I Die", the February 7, 1960 episode "Delia's Father", the February 28, 1960 episode "Prescribed Killing", the April 17, 1960 episode "Solomon River", the July 17, 1960 episode "Busted Up Guns", the August 28, 1960 episode "Tumbleweed", the September 18, 1960 episode "Two Mothers", the November 6, 1960 episode "Jedro's Woman", the December 4, 1960 episode "Kitty's Good Neighboring", the February 5, 1961 episode "Love of Money", and the May 7, 1961 episode "Ma's Justice".  

She began training for a theatrical career with actor/director Fritz Feld, whom she married in 1940. In 1942, she made her stage debut in the Los Angeles production of Hedda Gabler. While performing in the play, she was spotted by an agent from Warner Bros., who signed her to a film contract with the studio. Her first film for Warner was Edge of Darkness (1943), in which she played a Norwegian peasant girl. She was dropped by Warner Bros. in 1943 and signed with Universal Pictures in 1944. That year, Christine had a supporting role in The Mummy's Curse and The Wife of Monte Cristo, with her husband Fritz Feld (the two went go on to appear together in the Western 4 for Texas in 1963). In 1946, she appeared in The Scarlet Horseman, a 13-chapter film serial playing Carla Marquette, or Matosca, followed by a supporting role in the mystery film The Inner Circle. Christine's next film for Universal was the film noir classic The Killers. She initially tested for the lead role of femme fatale Kitty Collins, but lost out to Ava Gardner. The film's producer, Mark Hellinger, was impressed with her test and cast her as Lilly Harmon Lubinsky, the wife of Lt. Sam Lubinsky (Sam Levene). Christine also portrayed Miss Watston in the 1964 remake of the film, starring Lee Marvin and Angie Dickinson.

In 1950, she played an uncredited supporting role in The Men. Although the part was small and the film was not a commercial success, her performance impressed the film's producer, Stanley Kramer.  She became a favorite of his, and went on to appear in a number of his films, including Cyrano de Bergerac (1950) and High Noon (1952). Kramer later cast her in the 1955 drama Not as a Stranger, where she played a countrywoman. She also coached the film's star Olivia de Havilland on her Swedish accent. The following year, she co-starred in the horror film Invasion of the Body Snatchers. In 1961, Kramer cast her again as a German housekeeper in Judgment at Nuremberg. One of her most notable roles was as Hilary St. George, the bigoted co-worker of Katharine Hepburn's character in the 1967 film Guess Who's Coming to Dinner.

Television
In addition to her work in films, Christine also appeared in numerous television series. In the 1950s, she appeared in multiple guest roles on The Abbott and Costello Show, Four Star Playhouse, Dragnet, Alfred Hitchcock Presents, The Ford Television Theatre, Gunsmoke, Science Fiction Theatre, Matinee Theatre, Father Knows Best, Trackdown, State Trooper, Wanted: Dead or Alive, The Rifleman, Letter to Loretta, Superman, and General Electric Theater. In November 1959, Christine co-starred as the wife of a verbally abusive hypochondriac in the first-season episode of The Twilight Zone entitled "Escape Clause".

In 1960 and 1961, Christine guest-starred on episodes of Coronado 9, Rawhide, and The Untouchables. From 1961 to 1962, Christine had a recurring role as widow Ovie Swenson in the Western series Tales of Wells Fargo. She made four guest appearances on Perry Mason, including the role of defendant Beth Sandover in the season-six, 1962 episode, "The Case of the Double-Entry Mind", and murderer Edith Summers in the season-seven, 1963 episode, "The Case of the Devious Delinquent".  For the remainder of the decade, she continued with guest-starring roles in such shows as 77 Sunset Strip, Ben Casey, Bonanza, The Fugitive, Hazel, Wagon Train, The Virginian, Going My Way, The F.B.I., and Daniel Boone. In 1969, Christine co-starred in the ABC television movie Daughter of the Mind.

Her greatest fame came in 1965 when she began her 21-year stint as the matronly Mrs. Olson, who had comforting words for young married couples while pouring Folgers coffee in television commercials. They became a popular staple on television, whereupon the character began to be parodied by comedians and entertainers, including Carol Burnett, Johnny Carson, Bob Hope, Ann-Margret, and Jackie Gleason. She went on to appear in over 100 commercials for Folgers. In 1971, Christine's hometown of Stanton, Iowa, honored her by transforming the city water tower to resemble a giant coffee pot.

During the 1970s, Christine continued to work primarily in television. Her last role was on the 1979 animated series Scooby-Doo and Scrappy-Doo, in which she provided additional voices.

Later years

Christine retired from acting in 1979. After her retirement, she did volunteer work at Planned Parenthood, and served as a judge at the American College Theatre Festival. She was later appointed the honorary mayor of Brentwood, Los Angeles, where she and her husband resided for many years.

Personal life
In November 1940, Christine married character actor Fritz Feld. The couple had two sons, Steven and Danny. Christine and Feld remained married until his death in 1993.

Death
On July 24, 1996, Christine died at her Brentwood home of cardiovascular disease. Her interment was at the Jewish Mount Sinai Memorial Park Cemetery in the Hollywood Hills section of Los Angeles.

Filmography

References

External links

1920 births
1996 deaths
20th-century American actresses
Actresses from Iowa
American film actresses
American people of Swedish descent
American radio actresses
American stage actresses
American television actresses
Burials at Mount Sinai Memorial Park Cemetery
Film serial actresses
People from Brentwood, Los Angeles
People from Montgomery County, Iowa
University of California, Los Angeles alumni
Warner Bros. contract players
Deaths from cardiovascular disease